Mariatu Candé (born 28 October 1991) is a Bissau-Guinean footballer who plays as a left back for Bolivian club Mundo Futuro. She has been a member of the Guinea-Bissau women's national team.

Club career
Candé played in France.

International career
Candé played for Guinea-Bissau at senior level in the 2008 CAF Women's Olympic Qualifying Tournament.

References

1991 births
Living people
Women's association football fullbacks
Women's association football forwards
Bissau-Guinean women's footballers
People from Bolama Region
Guinea-Bissau women's international footballers
Bissau-Guinean expatriate footballers
Bissau-Guinean expatriate sportspeople
Expatriate footballers in Guinea
Expatriate footballers in Algeria
Bissau-Guinean expatriate sportspeople in France
Expatriate women's footballers in France
Bissau-Guinean expatriate sportspeople in Bolivia
Expatriate women's footballers in Bolivia